Barbara Weeks (October 27, 1906 - July 4, 1954) was an American actress and voice talent in the Golden Age of Radio. She was best known for her work in soap operas.

Early years
Weeks was the daughter of Mr. and Mrs. Edwin R. Weeks of Binghamton, New York. Her parents were singers before her father started a music store. "One of her ancestors, Mrs. Robert R. Jillson," was also an actress. Weeks attended the American Academy of Dramatic Arts.

Radio
A caption in a 1937 newspaper reported that Weeks' "radio career started in Mickey at the Circus and Roadways to Romance." However, another source reported, "She made her radio debut as a vocalist on a Portland, Maine, station." In June 1938, she had the lead role in an NBC broadcast of Anna Christie.

Her only lead role in a continuing radio program occurred when she played the title character in Her Honor, Nancy James, which began on CBS October 3, 1938, and continued through July 28, 1939.

Weeks' roles as a regular cast member in radio programs included those listed in the table below.

Source: Radio Programs, 1924-1984, except as noted.

Weeks also appeared in episodes of other programs, including Alias Jimmy Valentine, Philip Morris Playhouse, Mr. District Attorney, Theatre Guild of the Air, Mr. and Mrs. North, The Good Will Hour, Aunt Jenny's Real Life Stories, and Colgate Theatre of Romance.

Stage
Before venturing into radio, Weeks "was winning praise with stock companies." After attending the American Academy of Dramatic Arts, she "put in several years of stage trouping." She appeared in at least five Broadway productions between 1927 and 1936, including a revival of Lombardi Limited.

Name confusion
Weeks was often confused for fellow actress Barbara Weeks, who mainly worked in film. At one time, both lived in New York, which meant that "Barbara-in-radio frequently gets mail and telephone calls intended for Barbara-in-the-movies." The confusion even extended to some of the movie actress's relatives attending a performance of a touring stock company in which the radio actress appeared, expecting to see their cousin perform.

Personal life
On November 26, 1938, Weeks married actor Carl Frank, who played her husband in Young Doctor Malone. They also played husband and wife roles in Now and Forever -- A Love Story. They had a daughter, Roberta, born September 24, 1940.

References 

American radio actresses
American stage actresses
20th-century American actresses
1906 births
1954 deaths